Eudorylas restrictus is a species of fly in the family Pipunculidae.

Distribution
Great Britain, Czech Republic, Germany, Hungary, Slovakia, Switzerland

References

Pipunculidae
Insects described in 1966
Diptera of Europe